The "La Union Hymn" is the official anthem of the province of La Union in the Philippines.

History
The La Union Hymn was written and composed by Primitivo L. Acosta Jr.

The Sangguniang Panlalawigan of La Union officially adopted the song in 1999 with the passage of Ordinance No. 007-99. Four years later, it enacted revised lyrics with the passage of Ordinance No. 009–2003 on November 27, 2003.

Lyrics
Although currently the La Union Hymn only has official lyrics in English, on September 26, 2012 the Sangguniang Panlalawigan of La Union passed Ordinance No. 026-2012, making Ilocano an official language of the province. The ordinance includes provisions for singing the song in Ilocano – should lyrics in the language be adopted – no less than twice a year.

In 2016, Francisco Emmanuel Ortega, at the time representing the Abono Partylist in the House of Representatives, explained that the song's lyrics  should serve as a reminder of the province's commitment to unity and progress, and that it should continue aspiring to these ideals as it strives towards greatness.

References

External links
, produced by the Provincial Government of La Union

Regional songs
Culture of La Union
English-language Filipino songs
Asian anthems
Philippine anthems